Last 6 Hours is a 2022 Indian bilingual thriller film written Suresh Tuticorin and directed by Sunish Kumar. Shot in Malayalam and Tamil, the film was produced by the studio, Lazy Cat Productions. The film stars Bharath, Adil Ibrahim, Anu Mohan and Viviya Santh in leading roles.

The film's music is composed by Kailas Menon, with cinematography handled by Sinu Sidharth and editing done by Praveen Prabhakar. The Tamil version of the film was released in theatres on 5 August 2022.

Plot 
Shaun Morris is a naval officer who joins hands with his fiancée Rachel to set up a trap to take revenge on Luke, Shameer, Jaison, and Rahul, the robbers who killed his family

Cast 
 Bharath as Shaun Morris 
 Adil Ibrahim as Rahul 
 Anu Mohan as Shameer 
 Anoop Khalid as Luke 
 Viviya Santh as Elizabeth 
 Neena Kurup as Mother

Production 
The film's shoot was completed in March 2020. The teaser of the film was launched by Arya and Tovino Thomas.

Soundtrack

Release 
The film had a theatrical release on 5 August 2022. A reviewer from Times of India noted "people who haven't watched Don't Breathe might find Last 6 Hours interesting, however, for others, it's a passable thriller that tries way too hard to keep the audience on the edge". A critic from Outlook wrote "on the whole, Last Six Hours might not be as brilliant as Don't Breathe but it definitely is thrilling and makes you hold your breath in fear and anticipation".

References

External links

2022 films
Indian multilingual films
2020s Malayalam-language films
2020s Tamil-language films
Indian thriller films